Paul Fenech (born 21 November 1972) is an Australian filmmaker, film and television actor, director, producer and writer. He is best known for writing, directing, producing and starring in the television series  Pizza, Swift and Shift Couriers, Housos, Bogan Hunters, Fat Pizza: Back in Business and Housos Vs. Virus: The Lockdown, as well as the motion pictures Fat Pizza (2003), Housos vs. Authority (2012), Fat Pizza vs. Housos (2014) and Dumb Criminals: The Movie (2015).

Career
Early in his career, Fenech directed More Than Legends, a documentary highlighting Aboriginal culture through the eyes of elders from the Nyungar (W.A.), Arrernte (N.T.) and Tiwi (N.T.) groups.

He first achieved prominence by winning third place in Sydney's annual Tropfest short film festival in 1995 for a biographical short entitled Pizza Man based on his experiences as a pizza delivery driver.  He won the Tropfest award for best film in 1998 for Intolerance written by and starring Acclaimed Australian Comedy Superstar Austen Tayshus, although he had submitted the film under the pseudonym Laura Feinstein to appeal to the sensitivities of the judges, particularly Tropfest founder John Polson, who hoped that a female director would win the award.

Fenech was then able to secure a deal with Australian community broadcaster SBS to produce a sitcom based on his short film. Entitled Pizza, and premiering in 2000, it ran for five seasons, with the final season airing in 2007. A full-length motion picture based on the series entitled Fat Pizza was released in 2003. Over a decade later, Fenech combined the storyline of Pizza with that of his third SBS Series Housos to create the feature film Fat Pizza vs. Housos.

Following the success of Pizza, he created the sitcom series Swift and Shift Couriers. Series 1 began airing on SBS on 27 October 2008 and Series 2 premiered on 15 August 2011.

His third television show for SBS, Housos, first aired on 24 October 2011. To date, two series have been produced, in addition to two full-length, cinematically-released motion pictures, Housos vs. Authority (2012) and Fat Pizza vs. Housos (2014). Housos won the award for Most Outstanding Light Entertainment Program at the 2014 Logie Awards.

Fenech's program Bogan Hunters, a combination of comedy and reality television, began airing on 13 May 2014 on 7mate and was the channel's highest-rating entertainment program and second highest rating show to date.

Fenech has recently re-started his shows Fat Pizza and Housos on the 7 Network, after his deal with SBS was not renewed. These shows are under variations of the original name, both called, Housos Vs. Virus: The Lockdown and Fat Pizza: Back in Business. These spin-off shows star Fenech playing the same characters as he did in the original shows and most of the original cast, however the shows are far more lewd than their SBS filmed counterparts, with far more reference to touchy social issues such as the COVID-19 pandemic and a lot more nudity and swearing. These shows, airing on 5 November 2019 for Fat Pizza: Back in Business and the 26 October 2020 for Housos Vs Virus: The Lockdown have proven successful with consistently high ratings online.

Filmography

Charity work
In 2014, Fenech broke the Guinness World Record for 'Most Self Portrait (selfie) Photographs Taken in 24 hours’, taking a total of 2408. In order to qualify, each 'selfie' photograph had to be taken with a different participant. The event was held to raise money and awareness for Barnardo's Australia.

Awards and nominations

ARIA Music Awards
The ARIA Music Awards are a set of annual ceremonies presented by Australian Recording Industry Association (ARIA), which recognise excellence, innovation, and achievement across all genres of the music of Australia. They commenced in 1987. 

! 
|-
| 2013 || Pauly's Shorts || ARIA Award for Best Comedy Release ||  || 
|-

Tropfest
1998: Best Film (Intolerance, won)

Slamdance Film Festival
1999: Grand Jury Prize (Somewhere in the Darkness, nominated)

Logie Awards
2001: Most Outstanding Comedy Program (Pizza, nominated)
2002: Most Outstanding Comedy Program (Pizza, nominated)
2004: Most Outstanding Comedy Program (Pizza, nominated)
2005: Most Outstanding Comedy Program (Pizza, nominated)
2014: Most Outstanding Light Entertainment Program (Housos, won)

Australian Comedy Awards
2003: Outstanding Australian TV Comedy – character based (Pizza, nominated)

Australian Writers' Guild
2011: Comedy – Situation or Narrative (Housos, nominated)

References

External links

1972 births
Australian film directors
Australian people of Maltese descent
Australian television directors
Living people
Male actors from Sydney
Participants in Australian reality television series